Johannes "Hans" Manthey (born 8 March 1914) is a former football player turned manager. He played in pre–World War II Germany, as well as in the Bizone and East Germany. He later managed clubs in the DDR-Oberliga.

Career

As player 
Manthey had his greatest success in Dessau. His first senior matches came when he was just 17 years old, playing for Meidericher SV in the Bezirksklasse Niederrhein. For the 1932-33 season Manthey joined the Bezirksliga side SV Schwarz-Weiß Westende Hamborn where he stayed until 1936. He then left the Rhine area and joined SV Dessau 05, competing in the Gauliga Mitte, one of then 16 top flight leagues. He won the Gauliga championship six times, qualifying for the German championship play-offs. Manthey played in 17 of the 22 championship play-off matches, establishing himself as a midfielder. His last match in the German championship came on 16 April 1944, when Dessau lost at home 2-3 after extra time to Holstein Kiel.
After World War II, Dessau 05 was disbanded and replaced by a new club which changed names frequently. Manthey played for this new club, then called Sport-Union Dessau, until 1947 when he left for Werder Bremen. After staying in Bremen for half a year, he returned to Dessau and re-joined his club. After another short stint at Bremen, Manthey finally settled in Dessau and became player-manager of SG Dessau-Nord, which was renamed BSG Waggonbau Dessau in 1949.

As player-manager 
Waggonbau Dessau were one of the founding members of the Oberliga that was introduced as the top flight in the Soviet occupation zone in 1949. With Manthey at the helm, Dessau finished third in their first season and also won the inaugural FDGB-Pokal, beating Gera Süd 1–0. Manthey kept playing until the end of 1950–51 Oberliga season and played in 46 Oberliga matches. In his playing career, Manthey won several caps for the selections of the Gauliga Mitte, of Saxony-Anhalt (4) and of the Soviet occupation zone (2).

As manager 
At the start of the 1951–52 season, DDR-Liga side BSG Stahl Magdeburg signed Manthey as manager. He officially acted as player-manager again in his first season, playing in three matches. The club was soon renamed to BSG Motor Mitte Magdeburg, but Manthey was unable to win promotion to the Oberliga with the side. At the end of the 1954–55 season he was replaced by Heinz Joerk, but re-hired on 30 September 1956 when the club was in danger of relegation. He finished in third place and saw the club absorbed into SC Aufbau Magdeburg in 1957. When Magdeburg had a bad start to the 1958 season, he was fired again in April 1958.
He later managed lower league sides such as TuS Neustadt in Magdeburg or Chemie Rodleben.

References 

German footballers
East German footballers
1914 births
1. FC Magdeburg managers
1. FC Magdeburg players
Possibly living people
Place of birth missing (living people)
DDR-Oberliga players
Association football midfielders
East German football managers